Zhang Xiaoyu (born 28 July 1991) is a Chinese female volleyball player.

She competed at the 2012 FIVB Volleyball Women's Club World Championship, with her club Bohai Bank Tianjin.

References 

1991 births
Chinese women's volleyball players
Living people
21st-century Chinese women